Saropogon velutinus  is a species of Brachycera in the family of Asilidae (assassin flies). The scientific name of the species was first published in 1962 Carrera & Papvero.

References
"Saropogon velutinus Carrera & Papavero, 1962." GBIF.org, 3 Nov. 2014. Web. <https://www.gbif.org/species/1662556>.

Asilidae